Hawaii Volcanoes National Park is an American national park located in the U.S. state of Hawaii on the island of Hawaii. The park encompasses two active volcanoes: Kīlauea, one of the world's most active volcanoes, and Mauna Loa, the world's most massive shield volcano. The park provides scientists with insight into the development of the Hawaiian Islands and access for studies of volcanism. For visitors, the park offers dramatic volcanic landscapes, glimpses of rare flora and fauna, and a view into the traditional Hawaiian culture connected to these landscapes.

The park was originally established on August 1, 1916, as Hawaii National Park, which was then split into this park and Haleakalā National Park. In recognition of its outstanding natural values, Hawaii Volcanoes National Park was designated as an International Biosphere Reserve in 1980 and a World Heritage Site in 1987. In 2012, the park was depicted on the 14th quarter of the America the Beautiful Quarters series.

On May 11, 2018, the park was closed to the public in the Kīlauea volcano summit area, including the visitor center and park headquarters, due to explosions and toxic ash clouds from Halemaʻumaʻu, as well as earthquakes and road damage. Portions of the park, including the visitor center, reopened to the public on September 22, 2018. As of early 2022, most of the park is open; however, some road segments and trails as well as the Jaggar Museum of the Hawaiian Volcano Observatory are still closed to visitors.

Eruptive activity, ground collapses and explosions in the park ceased in early August 2018, and the lull in eruptive activity at Kīlauea continued until an eruption on December 20, 2020, at the Halemaʻumaʻu crater.

Environment

The park includes  of land.
Over half of the park was designated the Hawaii Volcanoes Wilderness area in 1978, providing solitude for hiking and camping. Wilderness designation covers the northwestern extension of the National Park, including Mokuaweoweo, the summit of the volcano Mauna Loa. In the southwestern portion of the park, a large chunk of wilderness includes several miles of coastline and a small portion southeast of the visitors center. Climates range from lush tropical rain forests, to the arid and barren Kaū Desert.

Recently eruptive sites include the main caldera of Kīlauea and a more active but remote vent called Puu Ōō.

The main entrance to the park is from the Hawaii Belt Road. The Chain of Craters Road leads to the coast, passing several craters from historic eruptions. The road had continued to another park entrance near the town of Kalapana, but that portion is covered by a lava flow, and is only available as an emergency evacuation route. The park's Kahuku District is accessible via Kahuku Road off Highway 11 near mile marker 70.

Climate

History

Kīlauea and its Halemaʻumaʻu caldera were traditionally considered the sacred home of the volcano goddess Pele, and Hawaiians visited the crater to offer gifts to the goddess.

In 1790, a party of warriors, along with women and children who were in the area, were caught in an unusually violent eruption. Many were killed and others left footprints in the lava that are still visible.

The first western visitors to the site, English missionary William Ellis and American Asa Thurston, went to Kīlauea in 1823. Ellis wrote of his reaction to the first sight of the erupting volcano:
″A spectacle, sublime and even appalling, presented itself before us. 'We stopped and trembled.' Astonishment and awe for some moments rendered us mute, and, like statues, we stood fixed to the spot, with our eyes riveted on the abyss below.″

The volcano became a tourist attraction in the 1840s, and local businessmen such as Benjamin Pitman and George Lycurgus ran a series of hotels at the rim. Volcano House is the only hotel or restaurant located within the borders of the national park.

Lorrin A. Thurston, grandson of the American missionary Asa Thurston, was one of the driving forces behind the establishment of the park after investing in the hotel from 1891 to 1904. William R. Castle first proposed the idea in 1903. Thurston, who then owned The Honolulu Advertiser newspaper, printed editorials in favor of the park idea. In 1907, the territory of Hawaii paid for fifty members of Congress and their wives to visit Haleakalā and Kīlauea, including a dinner cooked over lava steam vents. In 1908, Thurston entertained Secretary of the Interior James Rudolph Garfield, and another congressional delegation the following year. Governor Walter F. Frear proposed a draft bill in 1911 to create Kilauea National Park for $50,000. Thurston and local landowner William Herbert Shipman proposed boundaries, but ran into some opposition from ranchers. Thurston printed endorsements from John Muir, Henry Cabot Lodge, and former President Theodore Roosevelt. After several attempts, the legislation introduced by delegate Jonah Kūhiō Kalanianaole finally passed to create the park. House Resolution 9525 was signed by Woodrow Wilson on August 1, 1916. Hawaii National Park became the eleventh national park in the United States, and the first in a territory.

As stated in the foundation document:

Within a few weeks, the National Park Service Organic Act created the National Park Service to run the system. The park was officially renamed Hawaii Volcanoes National Park after being split from Haleakalā National Park on September 22, 1961.

An easily accessible lava tube was named for the Thurston family. An undeveloped stretch of the Thurston Lava Tube extends an additional  beyond the developed area and dead-ends into the hillside, but it is closed to the general public.

Painting of Pele 

About 1929, D. Howard Hitchcock made an oil painting of Pele, the Hawaiian goddess of fire, lightning, wind, and volcanoes. In 1966, the artist's son, Harvey, donated the painting to the Hawaii Volcanoes National Park, where it was displayed in the visitor center from 1966 to 2005. The painting was criticized for portraying the Hawaiian goddess as a Caucasian.

In 2003, the Volcano Art Center announced a competition for a "more modern and culturally authentic rendering" of the goddess. An anonymous judging panel of Native Hawaiian elders selected a painting by Arthur Johnsen of Puna, Hawaii from 140 entries. In Johnsen's painting, the goddess has distinctly Polynesian features. She is holding a digging stick (ōō) in her left hand and the egg that gave birth to her younger sister Hiiaka in her right hand. In 2005, the Hitchcock was replaced with Johnsen's painting.

Kahuku District expansion

In 2003, an additional  of the Kahuku Ranch were added to the park, the largest land acquisition in Hawaii's history. Now named the Kahuku District, the park was enlarged by 56% with the newly acquired land, which is west of the town of Waiōhinu and east of Ocean View. The land was purchased for $21.9 million from the estate of Samuel Mills Damon, with financing from The Nature Conservancy.

Recent events

On March 19, 2008, there was a small explosion in Halemaʻumaʻu, the first explosive event since 1924 and the first eruption in the Kīlauea caldera since September 1982. A small amount of ash was also reported at a nearby community. The explosion covered part of Crater Rim Drive and damaged Halemaʻumaʻu Overlook. The explosion did not release any lava, which suggests to scientists that it was driven by hydrothermal or gas sources.

This explosion event followed the opening of a major sulfur dioxide gas vent, greatly increasing levels emitted from Halemaʻumaʻu. The dangerous increase of sulfur dioxide gas prompted closures of Crater Rim Drive between the Jaggar Museum south/southeast to Chain of Craters Road, Crater Rim Trail from Kīlauea Military Camp south/southeast to Chain of Craters Road, and all trails leading to Halemaʻumaʻu, including those from Byron Ledge, Iliahi (Sandalwood) Trail, and Kaū Desert Trail.

In mid-May 2018, the Kīlauea District of the park was closed due to explosive eruptions at Halemaʻumaʻu, though the Kahuku District remained open. The Kīlauea District, including the visitor center, reopened to the public on September 22, 2018. Eruptive activity, ground collapses and explosions in the park had ceased in early August. At the summit, seismicity and deformation are negligible. Sulfur dioxide emission rates at both the summit and the Lower East Rift Zone are drastically reduced; the combined rate is lower than at any time since late 2007. Earthquake and deformation data show no net accumulation, withdrawal, or significant movement of subsurface magma or pressurization as would be expected if the system was building toward a resumption of activity.

A small water pond appeared in Halemaumau in the summer of 2019. An eruption in the crater that began on December 20, 2020, boiled away the water lake completely and began to partially refill the crater with lava.

As of 2022, most of the park is open, although some road segments, trails, and the Jaggar Museum of the Hawaiian Volcano Observatory remain closed. The Thurston Lava Tube (Nāhuku) was reopened to the public on February 21, 2020. Several large rockfalls were cleared and sensors were installed to monitor new cracks, along with improvements to water drainage and parking. The rockfalls and cracks had been caused by some of the 60,000 earthquakes recorded during the Kīlauea eruption.

In 2022, the Mauna Loa volcano erupted, after many years.

Pohue Bay expansion
Pōhue Bay is home to numerous well-preserved and significant Hawaiian cultural sites, including the largest recorded abrader quarry in Hawaiʻi, lava tubes, burial site, mauka-makai (mountain to sea) trails, fishing shrines, remains of once-thriving coastal villages, and petroglyphs. A well-preserved portion of the Ala Kahakai National Historic Trail or Ala Loa, an ancient coastal trail system, hugs the coastline.

The Pōhue coastline is critical habitat for federally listed endangered Hawaiian species, including the Hawaiian hawksbill turtle (honu‘ea) and Hawaiian monk seal. Rare endemic opae'ula (red shrimp) live in the area’s anchialine ponds, and the bay is often frequented by native and migratory birds, including ʻiwa (frigate bird), koaʻe kea (white tailed tropic bird), kōlea (golden plover), 'ulili (wandering tattler) and ʻaukuʻu (black crowned night heron).

Historic places

Several of the National Register of Historic Places listings on the island of Hawaii are located within the park:
 1790 Footprints
 Ainahou Ranch
 Ainapo Trail
 Kīlauea Crater
 Puna-Kāʻu Historic District
 Volcano House
 Whitney Seismograph Vault No. 29 at the Hawaiian Volcano Observatory
 Wilkes Campsite

Visitor center and museums

The nearby Volcano Art Center, located in the original 1877 Volcano House hotel, is listed on the National Register of Historic Places and houses historical displays and an art gallery.

The Thomas A. Jaggar Museum, now closed due to damage from the 2018 eruptive events, is located a few miles west on Crater Rim Drive. The museum featured more exhibits and a close view of Kīlauea's active vent Halemaʻumaʻu. The museum is named after scientist Thomas Jaggar, the first director of the Hawaiian Volcano Observatory, which adjoins the museum. The observatory itself is operated by the U.S. Geological Survey and is not open to the public.

The Kilauea Military Camp provides accommodations for U.S. military personnel. Volunteer groups also sponsor events in the park.

Superintendents
National park superintendents:
 1922–1922 — Albert O. Burkland
 1922–1926 — Thomas Boles
 1926–1926 — Albert O. Burkland
 1927–1928 — Richard T. Evans
 1928–1931 — Thomas J. Allen
 1931–1933 — Ernest P. Leavitt
 1933–1946 — Edward G. Wingate
 1946–1946 — Gunnar O. Fagerlund
 1946–1953 — Francis R. Oberhansley
 1953–1959 — John B. Wosky
 1959–1965 — Fred T. Johnston
 1965–1967 — Glen T. Bean
 1967–1970 — Daniel J. Tobin
 1970–1971 — Gene J. Balaz
 1971–1975 — G. Bryan Harry
 1975–1978 — Robert D. Barbee
 1979–1987 — David B. Ames
 1987–1987 — James F. Martin
 1987–1993 — Hugo H. Huntzinger
 1993–2004 — James F. Martin
 2004–2019 — Cynthia Orlando
 from 2019 — Rhonda Loh.

See also
 Devastation Trail
 Holei Sea Arch
 Kilauea Iki
 List of national parks of the United States

References

External links

 of the National Park Service
USGS Kīlauea volcano webcam and information page

Volcano Gallery: Hawaii Volcanoes National Park - Local Info Photo Gallery, Volcano Live Cam, Eruption Update and General Park Information.

 
Protected areas of Hawaii (island)
National parks in Hawaii
Geology museums in Hawaii
Museums in Hawaii County, Hawaii
Archaeological sites in Hawaii
Protected areas established in 1916
World Heritage Sites in the United States
Historic American Engineering Record in Hawaii
Historic American Buildings Survey in Hawaii
1916 establishments in Hawaii
Kīlauea